Takshi, also known as Tyakshi or Taqsi, is a remote village in Nubra valley, located on the banks of the Shayok River in the Leh district of UT Ladakh, India. It lies in the historical Chorbat Valley of the Baltistan region, which was divided between India and Pakistan by the modified ceasefire line (designated as the Line of Control) that was established in the 1972 Shimla Agreement. Tyakshi, along with Chalunka, Turtuk and Thang, became part of the Pakistani-administered Northern Areas following the Indo-Pakistani War of 1947–1948. All four of these villages were captured by Indian forces during the Indo-Pakistani War of 1971, after which they were incorporated into the erstwhile Indian-administered state of Jammu and Kashmir. Following the revocation of Article 370 by the Government of India in August 2019, Tyakshi formally fell under the jurisdiction of the Indian-administered union territory of Ladakh. After 1971 war four villages Pakistan controlled Kashmir were retained by India while many Indian villages in Chhamb sector were retained by Pakistan and line of control was defined.

History
See history of Turtuk and nearby areas.

Demographics
According to the 2011 Census of India, Takshi has 112 households. The effective literacy rate (i.e. the literacy rate of population excluding children aged 6 and below) is 85.56
%.

See also
 Indo-Pakistani War of 1971

References

Villages in Nubra tehsil